The James Cook University Law Review is an annual peer-reviewed law journal published by the James Cook University School of Law.

External links 
 

Australian law journals
Queensland law
Annual journals
Publications established in 1994
English-language journals
James Cook University